Baccatin III is an isolate from the yew tree (Genera Taxus).  Baccatin III is a precursor to the anti-cancer drug paclitaxel (Taxol).

In 2014, researchers reported introduction and expression of the endophytic fungal gene responsible for synthesizing baccatin III (10-deacetylbaccatin III 10-O-acetyltransferase), to the mushroom Flammulina velutipes. Researchers achieved the same accomplishment with Escherichia coli in 2000.

See also
 10-Deacetylbaccatin
 Taxadiene

References 

Taxanes
Benzoate esters
Acetate esters